Potaka Inlet is a narrow ice-filled inlet about 8 nautical miles (15 km) long, indenting the north side of Thurston Island immediately east of Starr Peninsula. It was first delineated from air photos taken by U.S. Navy Operation Highjump in December 1946. It was named by the Advisory Committee on Antarctic Names for Dr. Louis H. Potaka, a medical officer with the Byrd Antarctic Expedition, 1933–35.

Maps
 Thurston Island – Jones Mountains. 1:500000 Antarctica Sketch Map. US Geological Survey, 1967.
 Antarctic Digital Database (ADD). Scale 1:250000 topographic map of Antarctica. Scientific Committee on Antarctic Research (SCAR), 1993–2016.

References

Inlets of Ellsworth Land